Erasmus Webb B.D. (d. 24 March 1614) was a Canon of Windsor, England from 1590 to 1614

Career
He was educated at Gloucester Hall, Oxford where he graduated BA in 1568, MA in 1572 and BD in 1585.

He was appointed:
Vicar of St Clears, Carmarthen 1577
Rector of Ham, Wiltshire 1582
Rector of Bletchingdon, Oxfordshire 1583
Archdeacon of Buckingham 1589
Rector of West Ilsley, Berkshire 1601–1613

He was appointed to the ninth stall in St George's Chapel, Windsor Castle in 1590, a position he held until 1614.

He was buried in the chapel. His inscription read: "Hic jacet Erasmus Webb, Sacrae Theologiae Baccalaureus, cujus Regiae Capallae quondam Canonicus, qui obit 24 die Martii, Anno Domini 1613. Aetatis suae 63”

Notes 

1614 deaths
Canons of Windsor
Archdeacons of Buckingham
Alumni of Worcester College, Oxford
Year of birth missing